Bobrovitsa is a rural locality (a village) in Moseyevskoye Rural Settlement, Totemsky  District, Vologda Oblast, Russia. The population was 14 as of 2002.

Geography 
Bobrovitsa is located 34 km northwest of Totma (the district's administrative centre) by road. Fominskaya is the nearest rural locality.

References 

Rural localities in Tarnogsky District